Stročja Vas (in older sources also Stročja Ves) is a village in the Municipality of Ljutomer in northeastern Slovenia. The area traditionally belonged to the Styria region and is now included in the Mura Statistical Region.

Name
Stročja Vas was attested in written sources in 1438 and 1443 as Schuetzendorf (and also as Schüczendorff in 1443 and as Schuczendorf in 1468). The Slovene name is derived from the adjective *strelьčьja (via *streočja), thus originally meaning 'shooter's village'. This is confirmed by the medieval German transcriptions, which are a compound of Middle High German schütze 'shooter' + dorf 'village'. In the past the German name was Schützendorf.

Chapel
The local chapel in the centre of the settlement was built in the Neo-Gothic style in 1866 on the foundations of an older plague column. It was renovated in 1999.

References

External links
Stročja Vas on Geopedia

Populated places in the Municipality of Ljutomer